Gagamachay or Qaqa Mach'ay (Quechua qaqa rock, mach'ay cave, "rock cave", also spelled Gagamachay)  is a mountain in the Andes of Peru which reaches a height of approximately . It is located in the Ancash Region, Huari Province, on the border of the districts of Anra and Huacachi, and in the Huánuco Region, Huamalíes Province, Singa District.

References 

Mountains of Peru
Mountains of Ancash Region
Mountains of Huánuco Region